The Searchmont Motor Company was a Veteran Era American luxury automobile manufacturer in Philadelphia, Pennsylvania from 1900 to 1903.

History

Searchmont Motor Company 
Searchmont evolved in 1900 from the Keystone Motor Company (1899–1900) when this company had been bought out by Theodore C. Search (head of the Stetson Hat Company), Spencer Trask and other local businessmen.  Keystone managing director and engineer Edward B. Gallaher accepted a position as the factory and later general manager with the new company.

The Keystone Wagonette, a runabout for two passengers with a water-cooled single-cylinder engine located under the seat and with chain drive, stayed in production as the Searchmont Wagonette until 1902.  In November, 1901, the car became available with a new  twin engine  This engine was derived from the single cylinder engine, which was still offered, using many of the same parts.  Initially, a Searchmont Wagonette cost $750, .

Involved in the development of the Searchmont automobile was a young engineer named Lee Sherman Chadwick who was factory superintendent for Searchmont from 1901.  In 1902, Spenser Trask interested the well-known French Race car driver Henri Fournier, in the Searchmont company.  Fournier was the winner of the 1901 Paris–Bordeaux and Paris–Berlin races for Mors, and getting him involved with Searchmont would be great for advertising and branding.

Fournier-Searchmont Automobile Company 
On December 16, 1901, the Fournier-Searchmont Automobile Company was incorporated in a new reorganization that would double the investment capital.  Fournier-Searchmonts, and Fourniers' Mors race car were shown at the March 1902 Chicago Auto Show where Henry Fournier was headlined.  In May 1902 Fournier took on a large garage in Paris France and said he would spend only one month a year in the United States on Fournier-Searchmont business. 

Searchmont was very active in Endurance Trials and received blue ribbons for all three entries in the New York to Buffalo Run in 1901.  In the 1902 Long Island Trials, all three Searchmonts, and seven other participants were controversially disqualified for exceeding 15 miles per hour. 

E. B. Gallagher departed Searchmont in 1902 to become general manager of Mobile Company of America and Lee Chadwick became the chief-engineer and superintendent of the Searchmont factory. 

Two new front-engined cars were introduced for 1902 which featured many parts from the Wagonette. Both were runabouts with improved engines.

A larger Twin-engine, Type V appeared in time for the Chicago Auto Show. E. B. Gallagher is credited as the designer although it was heavily advertised as a Fournier-Searchmont. French influence is evident in the new Searchmont, shown in a certain resemblance with the contemporary Mors and the use of a pressure feed lubrication system, the first in a U. S. production car. The improved cars doubled in price over the $1,200 runabout, the Type III now priced at $2,000 and the Type V at $2,250, .

A new addition was the Type VII, a very attractive four-passenger Tonneau with a  two-cylinder engine and a wheelbase of 81 in. They cost $2,000 and $2,500, respectively.

Searchmont Automobile Company 
In June 1903 the Fournier-Searchmont Automobile Company became the Searchmont Automobile Company, along with some new corporate officers.  Also new was a large purpose-built factory near Chester, Pennsylvania.

This did not occur because as Lee Chadwick later reminisced, in the summer of 1903 "Spencer Trask got pinched in the stock market...and the rest of the gang just quit." The company was adjudged Bankrupt on December 29, 1903 and assets were liquidated the following year.

The John Wanamaker Department Stores who were investors and held New York and Philadelphia agency's for Searchmont, bought the remaining stock of 100 two-cylinder cars for only $750 a piece, selling them easily as 1904 Searchmonts at $1,200.  One of them was bought by Charles Yale Knight, who put the first of his sleeve valve engines in it.

Advertisements

Gallery

Legacy 
Lee Chadwick was disappointed that the new Searchmont four-cylinder car was abandoned. He bought all plans and the already delivered parts and founded his own company, the Fairmount Engineering Works, which soon became the Chadwick Engineering Works and started production. Its engine now delivered  and the car became the ancestor of a well-respected luxury sporting motor car.

The Type VI Tonneau chassis No. 310 pictured in the London to Brighton Veteran Car Run is in the collection at the Seal Cove Auto Museum. A second Searchmont, 1903 model five-passenger Deluxe Type VII, is in the collection of the Forney Transportation Museum.

External links 
 1904 Searchmont Type VI Tonneau at conceptcarz
 Seal Cove Museum - Searchmont Article
 Seal Cove Museum - 1904 Searchmont

References

Defunct motor vehicle manufacturers of the United States
Motor vehicle manufacturers based in Pennsylvania
Vehicle manufacturing companies established in 1900
Vehicle manufacturing companies disestablished in 1903
Luxury motor vehicle manufacturers
Veteran vehicles
Luxury vehicles
1900s cars
Cars introduced in 1900